La Bosse may refer to several places in France:

 La Bosse, Doubs
 La Bosse, Loir-et-Cher, now part of Vievy-le-Rayé
 La Bosse, Sarthe
 La Bosse-de-Bretagne, Ille-et-Vilaine